Louis Henry (1911 – 1991) was a French historian. He was the founder of the historical demography and one-place study fields. His 1956 book co-written with Michel Fleury, Des registres paroissiaux à l'histoire de la population. Manuel de dépouillement et d'exploitation de l'état civil ancien laid the foundation for studies in those areas.

Henry proposed that it was possible to reconstruct the population of France from 1670 to 1829. He devised more advanced methods and extracted data from records in order to correct bias and indicate which family histories could be used for different kinds of statistical analyses.

Henry is also responsible for the concept of natural fertility, which guided the way demographers have come to understand the idea of fertility control.

References
Paul-André Rosental, The Novelty of an Old Genre: Louis Henry and the Founding of Historical Demography, Population (English edition), Volume 58 –2003/1

Further reading
J. Dupâquier, Obituary: Louis Henry (1911-1991), Population Studies, Vol. 46, No. 3 (Nov., 1992), pp. 539–540.
Gerard Calot, Louis Henry (1911-1991), Population (French Edition), 47e Année, No. 1 (Jan. - Feb., 1992), pp. i-ii.
Henry, Louis (1961). “Some data on natural fertility,” Eugenics Quarterly 8: 81–91.

1911 births
1991 deaths
20th-century French historians
French male non-fiction writers
20th-century French male writers
Corresponding Fellows of the British Academy